Craig Cassady (born December 21, 1953) is a former American football defensive back. He played in the National Football League (NFL) for the New Orleans Saints in 1977.

References

1953 births
Living people
American football defensive backs
Ohio State Buckeyes football players
New Orleans Saints players